Ali Machani (born 12 July 1993) is a Tunisian professional footballer who plays as a centre back.

Honours 
CA Bizertin
Runner-up
 Tunisian Ligue Professionnelle 1: 2011–12

References

External links 
 

1993 births
Living people
Tunisian footballers
Tunisian expatriate footballers
Tunisia international footballers
Association football defenders
2015 Africa U-23 Cup of Nations players
Tunisia under-23 international footballers
CA Bizertin players
Espérance Sportive de Tunis players
Al-Shahania SC players
Tunisian Ligue Professionnelle 1 players
Qatari Second Division players
Expatriate footballers in Qatar
Tunisian expatriate sportspeople in Qatar
2016 African Nations Championship players
Tunisia A' international footballers